Orlik 2012 or simply Orlik is a Polish government project to build a football (soccer) and join volleyball–basketball fields in each gmina municipality in Poland before 2012 (time of UEFA Euro 2012 cohosted by Poland). As of 2010 there were 2,479 gminas throughout the country. Orlik is usually built within elementary (grade 1-6) or junior high school (grade 7-9) arena. The name (small eagle) refers to the coat of arms of Poland, while the Polish national teams are called the eagles.

Financing
Single object should cost less than 1 million polish złoty (300 000 U.S. dollars) and is equally financed by the State Treasury, voivodeship and gmina.

References

History of football in Poland
2012 in Poland